KUSE-LD, virtual channel 46 (VHF digital channel 12), is a low-powered Vision Latina-affiliated television station licensed to Seattle, Washington, United States. The station is owned by HC2 Holdings.

History
On May 31, 1990, the FCC issued a construction permit to Breckenridge Broadcasting Co., Inc. bearing the call sign K58DP for channel 58 in Seattle. On February 20, 1998, the unbuilt translator station was sold to VVI LPTV, Inc. By the end of 1998 K58DP had signed on the air broadcasting the ValueVision Network. On July 28, 2005, K58DP was sold to Equity Broadcasting Corp. and became KUSE-LP also on this date. KUSE-LP was licensed under EBC Seattle, Inc.

Previously, KUSE-LP had been broadcasting the ShopNBC Network (the successor to ValueVision), but as of May 31, 2007, it was rebroadcasting the KWDK broadcast.

As of September 30, 2008, KUSE-LP was broadcasting only a black screen and silent audio.  It was broadcasting an unmodulated carrier for several months.

The station ceased broadcasting on April 8, 2009 due to the economic difficulties that Equity has faced.

KUSE was sold at auction to Mako Communications on April 16, 2009.

On December 10, 2009, KUSE-LD started its low power digital transmitter and was broadcasting a test pattern. KUSE was multiplexed into 6 subchannels.

On January 31, 2012, an application was filed to change to Channel 18, with double the power as Channel 46. The channel change was to accommodate the move-in of K60GV from Bellingham to Maltby. The application was dismissed.

In June 2013, KUSE-LD was slated to be sold to Landover 5 LLC as part of a larger deal involving 51 other low-power television stations; the sale fell through in June 2016. Mako Communications sold its stations, including KUSE-LD, to HC2 Holdings in 2017.

Digital channels

References

External links

USE-LD
Innovate Corp.
Low-power television stations in the United States
Equity Media Holdings
Television channels and stations established in 1998
1998 establishments in Washington (state)
LX (TV network) affiliates